Sandra Bullock is an American actress and producer who made her film debut with a minor role in J. Christian Ingvordsen's thriller Hangmen in 1987. She made her television debut in the television film Bionic Showdown: The Six Million Dollar Man and the Bionic Woman (1989) and played the lead role in the short-lived sitcom Working Girl (1990) before making her breakthrough starring in Jan de Bont's action film Speed (1994). In 1995, Bullock founded her own production company, Fortis Films, and starred in the romantic comedy While You Were Sleeping. Her performance in the film earned her first nomination for the Golden Globe Award for Best Actress – Motion Picture Comedy or Musical. In 1996, Bullock starred in the film adaptation of John Grisham's novel A Time to Kill. In 1998, Bullock starred in the romantic comedy Practical Magic, voiced Miriam in the DreamWorks animated film The Prince of Egypt, and executive produced her first film, Hope Floats.

In 2000, Bullock garnered a second nomination for the Golden Globe Award for Best Actress in a Motion Picture – Comedy or Musical for her role as undercover FBI agent Gracie Hart, in the comedy Miss Congeniality. In 2002, she executive produced her first television series George Lopez and starred with Hugh Grant in the romantic comedy Two Weeks Notice. In 2004, Bullock starred in the crime drama Crash and shared the Screen Actors Guild Award for Outstanding Performance by a Cast in a Motion Picture with the rest of the film's ensemble cast. In 2006, Bullock reunited with her Speed co-star Keanu Reeves in the romantic drama The Lake House, and she also played Harper Lee in the Truman Capote biographical film Infamous.

In 2009, Bullock starred in the films The Proposal, All About Steve, and The Blind Side. Bullock won the Academy Award for Best Actress for her performance in The Blind Side, and also received the Golden Raspberry Award for Worst Actress for All About Steve. In doing so, she became the first person to win both a Razzie and an Oscar in the same weekend. In 2013, Bullock starred in the films The Heat and Gravity. For her performance in the latter, she received the Saturn Award for Best Actress and was also nominated at the Academy Awards, British Academy Film Awards, and Golden Globe Awards. In 2015, Bullock voiced the supervillain Scarlet Overkill in the animated film Minions. As of August 2020, Minions is her highest-grossing film, with a worldwide box office total of over $1.1 billion. In 2018, Bullock starred in the heist comedy film Ocean's 8, a spin-off of the Ocean's franchise, which was a commercial success. That same year, she starred in the post-apocalyptic thriller Bird Box, which had the largest debut week viewership for a Netflix film.

Film

Television

See also

 List of awards and nominations received by Sandra Bullock

References

External links
 
 

Actress filmographies

American filmographies